The 1896 New York state election was held on November 3, 1896, to elect the governor, the lieutenant governor and a judge of the New York Court of Appeals, as well as all members of the New York State Assembly. Besides, a constitutional amendment on forestry was proposed, and rejected with 321,486 votes for and 710,505 against it.

History
The Democratic state convention met on September 17 at Buffalo, New York, and endorsed the Free Silver platform of the Democratic national convention. Mayor of Albany John Boyd Thacher, a Gold Democrat, was nominated for governor on the first ballot (vote: Thacher 332, William Sulzer (Free Silver) 88, Wilbur F. Porter 20). Wilbur F. Porter (Free Silver) for lieutenant governor, and Robert C. Titus for the Court of Appeals, were nominated by acclamation. Thacher declined to run, and the Democratic State Committee met on September 28 at the Hotel Bartholdi in New York City, Elliott Danforth presided. They moved Porter one step up, and substituted Frederick C. Schraub (Free Silver) on the ticket for lieutenant governor.

Result
The whole Republican ticket was elected.

The incumbent Vann was re-elected.

At this time, automatic "ballot status" required 10,000 votes, which was reached by all parties.

Obs.: For candidates nominated on more than one ticket, the numbers are the total votes on all tickets.

Notes

Sources
A ballot from Orange County at Hudson River Valley Heritage
The tickets: ALL STATES WILL VOTE in NYT on November 2, 1896
The candidates: CANDIDATES FOR ELECTION in NYT on November 1, 1896
Result in New York City: CITY'S OFFICIAL COUNT in NYT on November 22, 1896
Result: THE VOTE OF NEW YORK; DECLARED BY THE STATE BOARD OF CANVASSERS in NYT on December 16, 1896
Result: The Tribune Almanac 1897

See also
New York gubernatorial elections

1896
1896 New York (state) elections